Ciro in Babilonia, ossia La caduta di Baldassare (Cyrus in Babylon, or The Downfall of Belshazzar) is an azione sacra in two acts by Gioachino Rossini with a libretto by Francesco Aventi. It was first performed at the Teatro Comunale in Ferrara during Lent, 1812. The exact date of the premiere is unknown but is believed to be 14 March. During Lent it was the custom for Italian opera houses either to close or to stage works on themes from the Bible. Ciro in Babilonia is one of two Lenten operas by Rossini (along with Mosè in Egitto) and is based on the Biblical story of the overthrow of the Babylonian king Belshazzar by the Persian ruler Cyrus the Great.

Performance history
In a concert form, the work's UK premiere took place on 30 January 1823 at the Theatre Royal Drury Lane in London. The quasi-opera premiered in the United States on 7 July 2012 at the Caramoor Center for Music and the Arts as part of the Festival, starring contralto Ewa Podleś in the title role, tenor Michael Spyres as Baldassare (Belshazzar), and soprano Jessica Pratt as Amira, with Will Crutchfield conducting. Performances with the same principal singers opened in a more elaborate staging on 10 August 2012 at the Rossini Festival in Pesaro.

Roles

Synopsis
Time: 539 B.C.
Place: Babylon

Recordings

References
Notes

Sources
Gossett, Philip; Brauner, Patricia (2001), "Ciro in Babilonia", in Holden, Amanda (ed.), The New Penguin Opera Guide, New York: Penguin Putnam. 
Osborne, Charles (1994), The Bel Canto Operas of Rossini, Donizetti, and Bellini, Portland, Oregon: Amadeus Press.  
Osborne, Richard (1998), "Ciro in Babilonia", in Stanley Sadie  (Ed.),  The New Grove Dictionary of Opera, Vol. One, p. 873. London: Macmillan Publishers, Inc.

External links
  Libretto in Italian  Retrieved 13 December 2012

1812 operas
Cultural depictions of Belshazzar
Cultural depictions of Cyrus the Great
Operas
Italian-language operas
Operas by Gioachino Rossini
Operas based on the Bible
Works set in the 6th century BC
Babylon in fiction